Bob chorba is a chorba, a Bulgarian soup. It is made from dry beans, onions, tomatoes, chubritza or dzhodzhen (spearmint) and carrots.

Local variations may also exclude the carrots or include paprika, potatoes or even some kind of meat. Historically, it has been a common soup and staple food at Bulgarian monasteries.

See also
 Bulgarian cuisine
 List of bean soups
 List of soups

References 

Bulgarian cuisine
Legume dishes
Bean soups
Staple foods
Tomato dishes